Paramatthamañjusā is a piece of Theravada Buddhist subcommentary literature by Dhammapāla on Buddhaghosa's 5th century work Visuddhimagga (English: The Path of Purification).

See also
Buddhaghosa
Dhammapāla
Subcommentaries, Theravada
Visuddhimagga

Theravada Buddhist texts
Buddhist commentaries